Sarn y Bwch, (Welsh for 'buck's causeway'), is one of three parallel reefs extending beneath the sea into Cardigan Bay from the west coast of Wales. The causeway, probably a medial moraine is made of glacial deposits left by receding ice sheets at the end of the last ice age. It is sometimes called Sarn y Bwlch ('the causeway of the pass'), but this form is later and less common than Sarn y Bwch.

Sarn y Bwch is the central of the three, extending south-westwards from near Tywyn. To the north is the causeway of Sarn Badrig, whilst to the south is Sarn Gynfelyn, which extends from near Aberystwyth.

External links
Cantre'r Gwaelod (The Lowland Hundred)
Map of Cardigan Bay underwater features

Reefs of Gwynedd
Cardigan Bay
Reefs of the Atlantic Ocean